In a supply chain, a vendor, supplier, provider or a seller, is an enterprise that contributes goods or services. Generally, a supply chain vendor manufactures inventory/stock items and sells them to the next link in the chain. Today, these terms refer to a supplier of any goods or service.

Description
A vendor is a supply chain management term that means anyone who provides goods or services of experience to another entity. Vendors may sell B2B (business-to-business; i.e., to other companies), B2C (business to consumers or Direct-to-consumer), or B2G (business to government). Some vendors manufacture inventoriable items and then sell those items to customers, while other vendors offer services or experiences.
The term vendor and the term supplier are often used indifferently. The difference is that the vendors sells the goods or services while the supplier provides the goods or services. In most of business context, except retail, this difference has no impact and words are interchangeable.

Typically vendors are tracked in either a finance system or a warehouse management system.

Vendors are often managed with a vendor compliance checklist or vendor quality audits, and these activities can be effectively managed by software tools

Purchase orders are usually used as a contractual agreement with vendors to buy goods or services.

Vendors may or may not function as distributors or manufacturers of goods. If vendors are also manufacturers, they may either build to stock or build to order.

"Vendor" is often a generic term, used for suppliers of industries from retail sales to manufacturers to city organizations. The term generally applies only to the immediate seller, or the organization that is paid for the goods, rather than to the original manufacturer or the organization performing the service if it is different from the immediate supplier.

Types
There are four basic sorts of vendors in the supply chain, and the companies and business owners play diverse responsibilities.

Manufacturers: A raw material, when transformed into finished goods, is with the help of the manufacturers. 

Retailer: A retailer is a reseller who sells things in a store or online, such as apparel, office supplies, street vendors selling hot dogs, and so on. 

A Service Provider provides a service, such as maintenance or labour, to customers. Consulting and janitorial services and many other such are two examples.

A Wholesaler sources products from manufacturers and resells them to retail establishments, distributors, and other buyers. They serve as a crucial intermediary in the supply chain, offering competitive pricing and convenient purchasing options.

There must be a vendor relationship with a supplier if a small firm or a major organization wants to resell a product. Vendor registration entails several steps in the process, including completing a credit application, placing a company credit card on file for payments, giving them your company phone number, and establishing payment terms.

See also
 Peddling
 Retailer
 Wholesaler

References

Supply chain management